Chayote (Sechium edule), also known as mirliton and choko, is an edible plant belonging to the gourd family, Cucurbitaceae. This fruit was first cultivated in Mesoamerica between southern Mexico and Honduras, with the most genetic diversity available in both Mexico and Guatemala. It is one of several foods introduced to the Old World during the Columbian Exchange. At that time, the plant spread to other parts of the Americas, ultimately causing it to be integrated into the cuisine of many Latin American nations.

The chayote fruit is mostly used cooked. When cooked, chayote is usually handled like summer squash; it is generally lightly cooked to retain the crispy consistency. Raw chayote may be added to salads or salsas, most often marinated with lemon or lime juice, but is often regarded as unpalatable and tough in texture. Whether raw or cooked, chayote is a good source of vitamin C.

Although most people are familiar only with the fruit as being edible, the root, stem, seeds and leaves are edible as well. The tubers of the plant are eaten like potatoes and other root vegetables, while the shoots and leaves are often consumed in salads and stir fries, especially in Asia.

Names and etymology 
The fruit goes by many English-language names around the world.  The common American English name of the fruit (outside of Louisiana) is from the Spanish word , a derivative of the Nahuatl word . The term chayote is also used in Puerto Rico.  In Louisiana and Haiti it is known as mirliton (pronounced ) also spelled mirleton or merleton in the United Kingdom (the r is often silent, e.g. Cajun me-lay-taw or urban Creole miʁl-uh-tɔ̃ns)

In Australia, New Zealand and Singapore, it is known as choko 

In China, it is referred to as foshugua, meaning "Buddha's palms melon".

In the eastern Caribbean, the United Kingdom and Ireland, it is known as christophene, while it is chou chou in Jamaica.

In India, the vegetable is called chow chow among other names; in the east and north east, it is simply known as squash and is a very popular vegetable used in both vegetarian and non vegetarian dishes.
 
In other parts of the world, the English name is often chou chou (e.g. in Mauritius), or a variant thereof (e.g. chuchu in Brazil).

In Madagascar and the western Indian Ocean, it is called "soasety."

Cultivation 
Like other members of the gourd family, chayote has a sprawling habit, and requires sufficient room. The roots are also highly susceptible to rot, especially in containers, and the plant in general is finicky to grow. However, in Australia and New Zealand it is an easily grown yard or garden plant, set on a chicken wire support or strung against a fence. In Trinidad and Tobago, it is grown in the mountainous areas strung from wire lines. In Latin America, chayote is widely cultivated. Depending on variety and region, yield reaches from 10 to 115 t/ha.

Soil and climate requirements 
Chayote requires humus-rich, well drained soils, which are slightly acid to acid (pH 4.5 to 6.5). Clay soils reduce crop productivity because they retain water and therefore promote growth of fungal pests.
Chayote adapts to a wide range of climatic conditions but grows best in regions with average temperatures of 13°-21 °C with at least 1500–2000 mm of annual precipitation.
The crop is not frost-tolerant, however it can be grown as an annual in temperate regions.

Taxonomy 
The plant was first recorded by modern botanists in P. Browne's 1756 work, the Civil and Natural History of Jamaica. Swartz included it in 1800 in its current genus Sechium.

The genus name Sechium is probably an alteration of the Ancient Greek σίκυος : síkyos "cucumber".  The species name edule means "edible".

Description 

In the most common variety, the fruit is roughly pear-shaped, somewhat flattened and with coarse wrinkles, ranging from 10 to 25 cm in length, with thin green skin fused with green to white flesh, and a single, large, flattened pit. Some varieties have spiny fruits. Depending on the variety, a single fruit can weigh up to 1.2 kg. The flesh has a fairly bland taste, and the texture is described as a cross between a potato and a cucumber.

The chayote vine can be grown on the ground, but as a climbing plant, it will grow onto anything, and can easily rise as high as 12 meters when support is provided. It has heart-shaped leaves, 10–25 cm wide and tendrils on the stem. The plant bears male flowers in clusters and solitary female flowers.

Culinary uses 
Although many people are familiar only with the fruit as being edible, the root, stem, seeds and leaves are edible as well. The tubers of the plant are eaten like potatoes and other root vegetables, while the shoots and leaves are often consumed in salads and stir-fries.

The fruit does not need to be peeled to be cooked or fried in slices. It has a very mild flavor. It is commonly served with seasonings (e.g., salt, butter and pepper in Australia) or in a dish with other vegetables and flavorings. It can also be boiled, stuffed, mashed, baked, fried, or pickled in escabeche sauce. Both fruit and seed are rich in amino acids and vitamin C. Fresh green fruit are firm and without brown spots or signs of sprouting; smaller fruit are usually more tender. Chayote can be sliced lengthwise and eaten using salad dressing dip. The seed is edible and tasty to some when served cold, dipped in dressing.

The tuberous part of the root is starchy and eaten like a yam; it can be fried. It can be used as pig or cattle fodder.

North America 
Culinary use of the chayote in North America has tended to be regional.  In Louisiana Creole and Cajun cuisine, the fruit is a popular seasonal dish for the holidays, especially around Thanksgiving, in a variety of recipes.
 

Chayote is an important part of traditional diets across Mesoamerica, and can be found in a variety of dishes.  In Guatemala, the darker fruit are known as güisquil, while the lighter, yellower variety is called perulero.  The root, known as ichintal, is also a seasonal delicacy there.  The fruit of the chayote is used in a type of Guatemalan chilaquiles called caldos, where a piece of cheese is placed between two slices of chayote and then dipped in egg batter and fried.

In Eastern Caribbean English the fruit, used as a vegetable, is known as christophene.  In Jamaica and other places in the western Caribbean it is known as chocho.  The fruit is called tayota in the Dominican Republic.

South America

In Brazil (locally called chuchu) and other Latin American countries, it is breaded and fried, or used cooked in salads, soups, stews and soufflés. 'Chuchu' (or 'Xuxú') is also a term of endearment in Brazil, like 'Honey' in English.

Asia 

Chayote is widely used in much of Asia, especially in tropical areas.

In temperate Northeast Asia, chayote is less common. In Korea, chayote is also known as chayote and is commonly used as a side dish in either pickled or marinated form. This fruit is most commonly pickled with vinegar and soy sauce (chayote-jangajji), or marinated and dressed with sauces and spices into a salad (chayote-muchim). In tropical Taiwan and southern China, chayotes are widely planted for their shoots, known as lóngxūcài. Along with the young leaves, the shoots are a commonly consumed vegetable in the region.

Chayote is widely used in Southeast Asia.  In the Philippines, the plant is known as sayote and is grown mostly in mountainous parts of the country such as Benguet and parts of Cordillera Administrative Region. Chayote is used in many kinds of dishes such as soup (often as a substitute for upo squash), stir-fried vegetables and chop suey. It was among the numerous vegetables, grains, and fruits introduced into the country via the Manila galleon trade.  In Indonesia, chayotes or labu siam are widely planted for their shoots and fruit.  (Labu siam, literally "Siamese gourd", is used in both Indonesia and Malaysia.)  It is generally used in Sundanese food as lalap and one of ingredients for Sundanese cuisine called sayur asem.  In Timor-Leste, chayote is called lakeru Japones. It is speculated that chayote was introduced by Japanese soldiers during World War II.  In Vietnam, chayote is called su su and is served in sautés, stir-fries and soups.  In Thai cuisine, the plant is known as sayongte or fak maeo (literally meaning "Miao melon"). It grows mainly in the mountains of northern Thailand. The young shoots and greens are often eaten stir-fried or in certain soups.  In Burma, the chayote is known as Gurkha thee or "Gurkha fruit" and is cheap and popular.

Chayote is also frequently eaten in South Asia.  In eastern and north eastern India and Nepal, the plant and fruit is called squash or ishkus ( in Nepali), probably derived from the English word squash. Its shoots, fruit and roots are widely used for different varieties of curries.  In the Indian state of West Bengal, it is generally known as squash. The whole vegetable is used to make curries, or it is sauteed. It is also cooked with fish, eggs or mutton. It is largely eaten during the summer and rainy season  as it contains much water and is a good source of vitamin C. The young branches are also considered for making items as saag or can be added into preparing shukto. There are two varieties available; dark green and light green. The dark green variety is much more tender than the lighter one, which develops a fibrous texture around its seed if harvesting or consumption is delayed.  In Tamil Nadu, South India, chayote is known as maerakkai or chow-chow in Tamil and widely used in everyday cooking for recipes like sambar, kootu, poriyal, thuvayal, chutney and mor-kulambu. Chow-Chow is the common name used in the markets.  In Karnataka, South India, chayote is popularly referred to as seeme badanekaayi in Kannada or "Bangalore brinjal"; "brinjal/eggplant/aubergine of the plateau". It is used in vegetable stews like sambar and palya.

Africa

Chayote is commonly eaten in the islands of the Indian Ocean.  In Réunion, the French overseas territory near Mauritius, chou chou, as it is known, is served in many dishes especially in the highlands. A popular starter of chou chou au gratin (baked with a cheese sauce), as a side with a meal and even as a dessert.  In Mauritius, it is called sousou and is cultivated in the high plateau of the island. Mixed with beef, pork or chicken, chou chou is widely used to make delicious steamed Chinese dumplings called niouk yen (boulette chou chou) or chow mai. Stems and leaves are consumed in bouillon to accompany rice and other dishes. The chou chou is also consumed as pickle, salad, gratin, curry and sauté with beef, egg or chicken.  In Madagascar, chayote (known in Malagasy as sôsety) is eaten in dishes such as saosisy sy sôsety (sausage and chayote) and tilapia sy sôsety (tilapia and chayote).

Europe 

In the Portuguese Autonomous Regions of Madeira and Azores, where the vegetable is popular, chayote is called pimpinela (or pepinela) and caiota, respectively.  In both regions, chayote is part of the local gastronomy, usually cooked with beans in the shell, potatoes, and corn cobs to accompany fish dishes, usually caldeiradas. In the Azores, chayote is also used in puddings and jams.

Folklore

Chayote as mock apple pie
In Australia, a persistent urban legend is that McDonald's apple pies were made of chokos (chayotes), not apples. This eventually led McDonald's to emphasise the fact that real apples are used in their pies. This legend was based on an earlier belief that tinned pears were often disguised chayotes. A possible explanation for the rumor is that there are a number of recipes in Australia that advise chayotes can be used in part replacement of canned apples to make the fruit go farther in making apple pies. This likely arose because of the economies of "mock" food substitutes during the Depression Era, shortages of canned fruit in the years following World War II, and the fact that apples do not grow in many tropical and subtropical parts of Australia, making them scarce. Chayotes, on the other hand, grow extensively in Australia, with many suburban backyards featuring chayote vines growing along their fence lines and outhouses.

Chayote as a mummification agent
Due to its purported cell-regenerative properties, it is believed as a contemporary legend that this fruit caused the mummification of people from the Colombian town of San Bernardo who extensively consumed it. The very well preserved skin and flesh can be seen in the mummies today.

Gallery

See also 
Araujia sericifera, a toxic weed that is often described as "choko-like".
List of vegetables

References

Sources 
 Rafael Lira Saade. 1996. Chayote Sechium edule (Jacq.) Sw. Promoting the conservation and use of underutilized and neglected crops. 8. Institute of Plant Genetics and Crop Plant Research, Gatersleben/International Plant Genetic Resources Institute, Rome, Italy.  available in pdf format

External links 

 Mirliton.org, A nonprofit organization promoting growing techniques and conservation of mirlitons (Louisiana name for chayote)
 Chayote Information Purdue University Horticulture
 Growing Chayote Mother Earth News
 Güisquil (wiskil), Sechium edule, chayote is a major crop in Mayan agriculture Maya Ethnobotany

Crops originating from Mexico
Crops originating from the Americas
Sechium edule
Flora of Barbados
Sechium edule
Flora of Guatemala
Flora of Jamaica
Sechium edule
Flora of Nepal
Flora of Nicaragua
Sechium edule
Sechium edule
Sechium edule
Fruit vegetables
Leaf vegetables
Medicinal plants of Central America
Medicinal plants of North America
Belizean cuisine
Haitian cuisine
Mexican cuisine
Nicaraguan cuisine
Salvadoran cuisine
Tropical agriculture